Butterfly Glacier is in Wenatchee National Forest in the U.S. state of Washington and is on the northwest slopes of the northwest summit of Luahna Peak and the ridge which extends west from the peak. An arête separates Butterfly Glacier from Pilz Glacier to the east.

See also
List of glaciers in the United States

References

Glaciers of the North Cascades
Glaciers of Chelan County, Washington
Glaciers of Washington (state)